Explosive Pro Wrestling also known as EPW is an Australian independent professional wrestling promotion founded in 2001 in Perth, Western Australia.

History
As of August 2014, Global Force Wrestling announced working agreements with Explosive Pro Wrestling.

EPW hosts monthly shows at the Gate One Theatre at the Claremont Showground.
 
Previously, shows were held at Bassendean's Cyril Jackson Recreation Centre. The promotion focuses on a balance between action, tension, and comedy. The company runs shows in venues of all sizes in their area, and has held annual charity fundraisers.

EPW's School of Pro Wrestling is the Professional Wrestling school, based in both North and South Perth is directly associated with Explosive Pro Wrestling. The EPW School of Pro Wrestling is led by Head Coach Davis Storm. Other coaches include Gavin McGavin, Damian Slater, Marcius Pitt, Del Cano, Michael Morleone, Taylor King, Julian Ward, Jay Taylor, Zenith & Mikey Broderick.

Explosive Pro Wrestling had a television series on Access 31 called EPW Monday Night Wrestling from 2008–2010.

2016 saw EPW start up its Vimeo channel, From the Vault, which now contains over 100 shows going back to 2003. EPW action can also be viewed worldwide on platforms such as Demand Progress, Highspots Wrestling Network, and Powerslam TV.

In April 2018, Progress Wrestling co-promoted a show with Australian independent professional wrestling promotion's Explosive Pro Wrestling, Melbourne City Wrestling and Pro Wrestling Australia.

Championships and accomplishments

Current champions

Inactive championships

Accomplishments

EPW Championship

Reigns

Combined reign

EPW Tag Team Championship

Names

Reigns

Combined Reigns (Team)

Combined Reigns (Individual)

EPW Coastal Championship

Names

Reigns

Combined Reigns

EPW Rising Star Cup Championship

Name

Reigns

Combined Reigns

EPW Hardcore Championship

Names

Reigns

Combined reigns

EPW Unofficial Women’s Championship

Names

Reigns

Combined Reigns

See Also 

 Professional wrestling in Australia
 List of professional wrestling organisations in Australia

References

External links 

 
 Cagematch profile

Australian professional wrestling promotions
Sport in Perth, Western Australia
Entertainment companies established in 2001
2001 establishments in Australia
Companies based in Perth, Western Australia